Joseph Patrick Kinnear (born 27 December 1946) is an Irish former football manager and player. Kinnear played as a defender, spending the majority of his career—ten seasons—with Tottenham Hotspur. With Tottenham he won the FA Cup, the EFL Cup twice, the FA Community Shield and the UEFA Cup. Kinnear was born in Dublin, moving to Watford, England at the age of seven. He was capped 26 times for the Republic of Ireland national football team. Following the end of his playing career he has also been the manager of India, Nepal, Doncaster Rovers, Wimbledon, Luton Town, Nottingham Forest and Newcastle United.

Early life
Kinnear moved to England at the age of eight. His father died when Kinnear was young and his mother brought up five children on a council estate in Watford.

Club career

Kinnear first made an impression as a player with St Albans City. His talent as a defender was recognised and in 1963, aged 17, he moved to Tottenham Hotspur as an amateur footballer. Learning his footballing skills under the managership of Bill Nicholson, Kinnear made his Tottenham debut on 8 April 1966 in a 4–1 home defeat by West Ham United. He spent ten years with Tottenham, playing in the 1967 FA Cup final as right back against Chelsea, a game Tottenham won 2–1. Kinnear made almost 200 league appearances for Tottenham, scoring two league goals. He won four major honours during his time at the club: the FA Cup in 1967; the UEFA Cup in 1972 and the EFL Cup on two occasions (in 1971 and 1973). In 1975, he moved to Brighton, where he made 16 appearances before retiring aged 30.

International career
Kinnear was capped 26 times by the Republic of Ireland, scoring no goals. His debut came in the 2–1 defeat by Turkey on 22 February 1967.

Management

Asia
After his retirement from football in 1977, Kinnear spent five years in Sharjah in the United Arab Emirates managing Sharjah and Al-Shabab (alongside Dave Mackay), also spending time coaching in Malaysia. He spent three months coaching India and one year coaching Nepal, later returning to England to assist Mackay at Doncaster Rovers.

Wimbledon
Kinnear briefly took charge of Doncaster after Mackay's departure in 1989 but was replaced by Billy Bremner after a consortium completed their takeover of the club. Kinnear was appointed reserve team manager of Wimbledon later that year before being appointed manager at the club following Peter Withe's dismissal in January 1992. Kinnear led the Dons to a 6th-place finish in the Premier League in the 1993–94 season. He was voted Premier League Manager of the Month three times by the end of the season as Wimbledon finished above more established teams including Liverpool, Aston Villa, Everton and Tottenham Hotspur.

The next season Kinnear continued to defy the odds and Wimbledon finished 9th in the league.

It was reported that Kinnear turned down the chance to replace Jack Charlton as manager of the Republic of Ireland national team in 1996. Kinnear then guided Wimbledon to semi-finals in both of the major domestic cup competitions in 1997 as well as finishing 8th in the Premier League. However, when Wimbledon were taken over by new Norwegian owners after the end of that season, it was widely reported that Kinnear would be axed as manager in favour of Norwegian coach Age Hareide, but the change of management never happened and Kinnear remained at the Wimbledon helm for a further two seasons.

Kinnear continued in his role as Wimbledon until he suffered a heart attack before a league game against Sheffield Wednesday in March 1999. He stood down in June of that year and was replaced at Wimbledon by Egil Olsen. Wimbledon were relegated from the Premier League the following season.

Luton Town
Before returning to football management with Luton Town, Kinnear was a front runner to replace Martin O'Neill at Leicester City,
and also considered taking over the struggling Sheffield Wednesday.
Instead, Kinnear would be briefly involved as Director of football at Oxford United during the 2000–01 season.
In January 2001, he resigned, reportedly, due to poor health. Kinnear's lack of input at Oxford is seen as the real reason behind his move away. Just a few weeks later he was handed a similar role at Luton Town, who were battling against relegation from what was then the Second Division, as were Oxford. On arrival, Kinnear demoted then-manager Lil Fuccillo and appointed himself manager of the team.

He could not save the club from relegation, despite purchasing striker Steve Howard for £50,000 on transfer deadline day. In the summer of 2001, Kinnear released the majority of the relegated squad, and brought in a number of his own men over the course of the season, including future captains Kevin Nicholls and Chris Coyne, along with winger Jean-Louis Valois. The team stormed to promotion under Kinnear's guidance, finishing runners-up to Plymouth Argyle in the Hatters' first promotion in 20 years.

The next season was disappointing for the Hatters, as they were expected to compete for promotion, but in the end they only managed a 9th-place finish. In May 2003 the club was sold to a consortium, led by John Gurney, which led to Kinnear and his assistant Mick Harford being sacked in mysterious circumstances, citing a Northampton Town employee's signature on the letters which confirmed the dismissal.

Nottingham Forest
Kinnear was out of work until Nottingham Forest offered him the manager's job in February 2004,
taking over from Paul Hart. Forest were in the bottom third of the league table when he took over, but he would have an immediate impact on the club.
Kinnear was able to get the club up to 14th position by the end of the 2003–04 season. The following season began with talk of promotion,
but would go badly for Forest and Kinnear, with just four wins from the first 23 games in the league that year. A 3–0 defeat by rivals Derby County at Pride Park, signalled the end for Kinnear, with his resignation coming on 16 December 2004.
Nottingham Forest were 22nd in the EFL Championship table following Kinnear's departure, the club appointed Mick Harford to take over as interim manager. Forest would ultimately be relegated at the end of the season, after Gary Megson had been appointed as the full-time replacement to Kinnear.

Newcastle United (2008–09)
Kinnear was without a club following his departure from Nottingham Forest for almost four years and had not been involved in the top flight since 1999, there were rumours about joining several clubs during this time including QPR.
On 26 September 2008, Kinnear was named as the interim manager of Premier League side Newcastle United until the end of October, following the shock resignation of Kevin Keegan who had publicly berated the owners and directors of the club, suggesting corruption and lack of clarity over who was in charge of the squad. The initial one-month period was extended for an additional month, keeping Kinnear at St James' Park until the end of December.

On 2 October 2008, Kinnear launched a verbal tirade at the Daily Mirror journalist Simon Bird, calling him a "cunt".
He swore over 50 times in the first five minutes of the interview. The club's press officer tried to order the assembled journalists not to publish any extracts from the tirade, but Kinnear himself gave the journalists permission to write up whatever they wanted from his remarks. Later in the interview, he announced that he would no longer deal with the national media while he was Newcastle manager, and that he would only speak to local newspapers from then on, with first team coach Chris Hughton handling all other interviews.

Kinnear's first two games in charge, against Everton and Manchester City, both ended as 2–2 draws. Kinnear's first win at Newcastle was against West Bromwich Albion. Newcastle won the match 2–1, with the first goal coming from Joey Barton, who was making his first starting appearance for Newcastle since being released from prison during the summer. He then followed this up with a surprise win against fifth-placed Aston Villa to lift Newcastle off the foot of the table and out of the relegation zone. Two goals from Obafemi Martins secured the 2–0 victory.

On 31 October 2008, Kinnear stated that 22 November would be "D–Day" with regards to the sale of Newcastle United and his position as manager.
This turned out to be untrue, as Kinnear was confirmed as being in charge for another month after Newcastle's 0–0 draw with Chelsea. On 28 November, Kinnear was named as the permanent manager of Newcastle until the end of the 2008–09 season.

Kinnear continued his event-filled season in charge by getting sent off on 6 December after a confrontation with referee Mike Riley during a 2–2 draw with Stoke City, having been up by two goals for most of the match.
After that disappointing draw with Stoke, they followed with wins against Portsmouth and Tottenham Hotspur, which was Newcastle's fifth consecutive league victory against the North London team.

Following a 5–1 defeat by Liverpool on 28 December, Kinnear re-affirmed his belief that the Newcastle squad lacked strength in depth – with the manager having fielded a makeshift side due to injuries and suspensions resulting from the 2–1 Boxing Day defeat by Wigan Athletic – and stated that he was looking to improve the side with transfers in the January window.
In January, Kinnear secured the signings of Peter Løvenkrands, Kevin Nolan and Ryan Taylor. The latter had been signed in a part exchanged deal with Charles N'Zogbia. N'Zogbia had frequently stated in the press, via his agent, that he wished to leave after Kinnear mispronounced his name during an interview in which he called him "insomnia". He also stated that he would not consider a return to Newcastle as long as Kinnear was the manager. Shay Given was also sold to Manchester City for £7m.

On 7 February 2009, Kinnear was taken to hospital after feeling ill, hours before Newcastle's clash with West Brom. The club stated that it was just precautionary and that Chris Hughton would take charge of the team. Newcastle won 3–2, their first win since Christmas. It was later announced Kinnear would require a heart bypass operation and that Alan Shearer would take over the managerial role for the remainder of the season. Joe Kinnear's contract officially expired at Newcastle on 30 May 2009.

Director of Football at Newcastle United (2013-2014)
On 16 June 2013, in a series of telephone interviews Kinnear claimed he had been appointed as director of football for Newcastle United. In a Talksport interview over the telephone on 17 June 2013, Kinnear claimed to have replaced someone called "Derek Lambesi" (sic) as the club's director of football, signed Dean Holdsworth at Wimbledon for £50,000 (actually £650,000), sold Robbie Earle (retired a year after Kinnear left), signed goalkeeper Tim Krul when he was previously manager (actually signed by Graeme Souness three years prior) and has been awarded the LMA Manager of the Year award three times despite only winning the award once, he also said he'd never been sacked in his life. Kinnear claimed to have signed John Hartson on a free when he in fact paid £7.5 million for the striker. He also mispronounced the names of Yohan Cabaye, Hatem Ben Arfa, Shola Ameobi and others in the Talksport interview. The appointment, a three-year contract, was confirmed by Newcastle United on 18 June. The confusion around Kinnear's appointment to the role was criticised by former club chairman Freddy Shepherd in an interview with BBC Sport. Kinnear drew criticism when the 2013 summer transfer window closed with Kinnear failing to make a single permanent signing, lone recruit Loïc Rémy having been signed on loan from Queens Park Rangers. This criticism intensified at the end of the 2014 winter transfer window with Kinnear failing again to make a permanent signing, this after the £20 million sale of midfielder Yohan Cabaye, with Luuk de Jong having been brought in on loan from Borussia Mönchengladbach.

On 3 February 2014, Kinnear resigned from his position of director of football at Newcastle.

In 2021 it was announced that since 2015 he has been living with dementia.

Career statistics

Managerial statistics
Source:

Honours

Player
Tottenham Hotspur
FA Cup: 1966–67
Football League Cup: 1970–71, 1972–73
FA Charity Shield: 1967 (shared)
UEFA Cup: 1971–72

Manager
Nepal
South Asian Games runner-up: 1987

Luton Town
Football League Third Division runner-up: 2001–02

Individual
LMA Manager of the Year: 1994
Premier League Manager of the Month: September 1993, March 1994, April 1994, September 1996

References

External links

Joe Kinnear archive at BBC Sport
Joe Kinnear Photo Gallery at Football365.com

1946 births
Living people
Association football defenders
Brighton & Hove Albion F.C. players
Expatriate football managers in the United Arab Emirates
India national football team managers
Luton Town F.C. managers
Nepal national football team managers
Newcastle United F.C. managers
Nottingham Forest F.C. managers
English Football League managers
Premier League managers
Republic of Ireland association footballers
Republic of Ireland football managers
Republic of Ireland expatriate football managers
Republic of Ireland international footballers
Association footballers from County Dublin
English Football League players
Tottenham Hotspur F.C. players
Wimbledon F.C. managers
Newcastle United F.C. non-playing staff
Expatriate football managers in Nepal
UEFA Cup winning players
Irish expatriate sportspeople in India
Irish expatriate sportspeople in England
Irish expatriate sportspeople in Nepal
FA Cup Final players
Association football coaches
People with dementia
Irish expatriate sportspeople in the United Arab Emirates